Geneviève Picot is an Australian stage, film and television actress. In 1983 Picot was nominated for an AACTA Award for Best Actress in a Leading Role for her performance in Undercover and in 1991 was nominated for the same award for Proof. She is a graduate of the National Institute of Dramatic Art and some of her other performances include The Timeless Land, The Sullivans and Bread and Roses.

Filmography

FILM

TELEVISION

References

External links

1950s births
Living people
Australian film actresses
Australian stage actresses
Australian television actresses
Actresses from Hobart
21st-century Australian actresses